Ectoine (1,4,5,6-tetrahydro-2-methyl-4-pyrimidinecarboxylic acid) is a natural compound found in several species of bacteria. It is a compatible solute which serves as a protective substance by acting as an osmolyte and thus helps organisms survive extreme osmotic stress. Ectoine is found in high concentrations in halophilic microorganisms and confers resistance towards salt and temperature stress. Ectoine was first identified in the microorganism Ectothiorhodospira halochloris, but has since been found in a wide range of Gram-negative and Gram-positive bacteria. Other species of bacteria in which ectoine was found include:
 Brevibacterium linens
 Halomonas elongata
 Marinococcus halophilus
 Pseudomonas stutzeri
 Halomonas titanicae
 Halorhodospira halophila
 Halomonas ventosae

Biosynthesis 
Ectoine is synthesized in three successive enzymatic reactions starting from aspartic β-semialdehyde. The genes involved in the biosynthesis are called ectA, ectB and ectC, and they encode the enzymes L-2,4-diaminobutyric acid acetyltransferase, L-2,4-diaminobutyric acid transaminase and L-ectoine synthase, respectively.

Use 
Ectoine is used as an active ingredient in skin care and sun protection products. It stabilizes proteins and other cellular structures and protects the skin from stresses like UV irradiation and dryness.

References 

Amidines
Carboxylic acids